Acrapex is a genus of moths of the family Noctuidae. It was described by George Hampson in 1894.

Description
Species are more slenderly built. In the forewings, the apices are more produced. Vein 7 or from just beyond end of areole. The hindwings with excurved outer margin at veins 2 to 4. Veins 6, 7 and 3, 4 stalked. Vein 5 bent at origin.

Species

 Acrapex abbayei Laporte, 1984
 Acrapex acuminata (Hampson, 1894)
 Acrapex aenigma (Felder & Rogenhofer, 1874)
 Acrapex albicostata (Lower, 1905)
 Acrapex albicostata Hampson, 1916
 Acrapex albivena Hampson, 1910
 Acrapex apexangula Laporte, 1984
 Acrapex apicestriata (Bethune-Baker, 1911)
 Acrapex atriceps Hampson, 1910
 Acrapex ausseili Laporte, 1984
 Acrapex azumai Sugi, 1970
 Acrapex biroseata Berio, 1976
 Acrapex boulardi Laporte, 1984
 Acrapex breviptera Janse, 1939
 Acrapex brunnea Hampson, 1910
 Acrapex brunneolimbata Berio, 1947
 Acrapex bryae Laporte, 1984
 Acrapex carnea Hampson, 1905
 Acrapex concolorana Berio, 1973
 Acrapex congitae Laporte, 1984
 Acrapex cuprescens Hampson, 1914
 Acrapex curvata Hampson, 1902
 Acrapex dallolmoi Berio, 1973
 Acrapex exanimis (Meyrick, 1899)
 Acrapex exsanguis Lower, 1902
 Acrapex fayei Laporte, 1984
 Acrapex ferenigra Berio, 1973
 Acrapex festiva Janse, 1939
 Acrapex fletcheri Laporte, 1984
 Acrapex franeyae Laporte, 1984
 Acrapex fuscifasciata Janse, 1939
 Acrapex genrei Laporte, 1984
 Acrapex gibbosa Berio, 1973
 Acrapex girardi Laporte, 1984
 Acrapex guiffrayorum Laporte, 1984
 Acrapex hamulifera (Hampson, 1893)
 Acrapex hemiphlebia (Hampson, 1914)
 Acrapex holoscota (Hampson, 1914)
 Acrapex ignota Berio, 1973
 Acrapex lepta Krüger, 2005
 Acrapex leptepilepta Krüger, 2005
 Acrapex leucophlebia Hampson, 1894
 Acrapex malagasy Viette, 1967
 Acrapex mastawatae Laporte, 1984
 Acrapex matilei Laporte, 1984
 Acrapex melianoides Warren, 1911
 Acrapex metaphaea Hampson, 1910
 Acrapex minima Janse, 1939
 Acrapex mischus D. S. Fletcher, 1959
 Acrapex mutans Berio, 1973
 Acrapex mystica Janse, 1939
 Acrapex obsoleta Berio, 1973
 Acrapex ottusa Berio, 1973
 Acrapex pacifica Holloway, 1979
 Acrapex parvaclara Berio, 1973
 Acrapex peracuta Berio, 1955
 Acrapex permystica Berio, 1974
 Acrapex pertusa Berio, 1973
 Acrapex postrosea Hulstaert, 1924
 Acrapex prisca (Walker, 1866)
 Acrapex punctosa Berio, 1973
 Acrapex quadrata Berio, 1973
 Acrapex relicta Ferguson, 1991
 Acrapex rhabdoneura Hampson, 1910
 Acrapex roseola Hampson, 1918
 Acrapex roseonigra Berio, 1976
 Acrapex roseotincta Hampson, 1910
 Acrapex satanas Laporte, 1984
 Acrapex seydeli Berio, 1973
 Acrapex simbaensis Le Cerf, 1922
 Acrapex similimystica Berio, 1976
 Acrapex simplex Janse, 1939
 Acrapex sogai Viette, 1967
 Acrapex sparsipuncta Laporte, 1984
 Acrapex spoliata (Walker, 1863)
 Acrapex stictisema Hampson, 1914
 Acrapex stygiata (Hampson, 1910)
 Acrapex subalbissima Berio, 1973
 Acrapex syscia D. S. Fletcher, 1961
 Acrapex sysciodes Berio, 1973
 Acrapex totalba Berio, 1973
 Acrapex tristrigata Warren, 1914
 Acrapex uncina Berio, 1973
 Acrapex uncinoides Berio, 1973
 Acrapex undulata Berio, 1955
 Acrapex unicolora (Hampson, 1910)

References

 
 

Xyleninae
Noctuoidea genera